The Kordofanian languages are a geographic grouping of five language groups spoken in the Nuba Mountains of the Kurdufan, Sudan: Talodi–Heiban languages, Lafofa languages, Rashad languages, Katla languages and Kadu languages. The first four groups are sometimes regarded as branches of the hypothetical Niger–Congo family, whereas Kadu is now widely seen as a branch of the proposed Nilo-Saharan family.

History 
In 1963, Joseph Greenberg added them to the Niger–Congo family, creating his Niger–Kordofanian proposal. The Kordofanian languages have not been shown to be more distantly related than other branches of Niger–Congo, however, and they have not been shown to constitute a valid group. Today, the Kadu languages are excluded, and the others are usually included in Niger–Congo proper.

Roger Blench notes that the Talodi and Heiban families have the noun class systems characteristic of the Atlantic–Congo core of Niger–Congo but that the two Katla languages have no trace of ever having had such a system. However, the Kadu languages and some of the Rashad languages appear to have acquired noun classes as part of a Sprachbund rather than having inherited them. Blench concludes that Talodi and Heiban are core Niger–Congo whereas Katla and Rashad form a peripheral branch along the lines of Mande.

Heiban, Katloid, and Talodi are also grouped together in an automated computational analysis (ASJP 4) by Müller et al. (2013). However, since the analysis was automatically generated, the grouping could be either due to mutual lexical borrowing or genetic inheritance.

Talodi–Heiban languages 

The Heiban languages, also called Koalib or Koalib–Moro, and the Talodi languages, also called Talodi–Masakin, are part of the Talodi–Heiban group.

Lafofa languages 

Lafofa (Tegem) was for a time classified with Talodi, but appears to be a separate branch of Niger–Congo.

Rashad languages 

The number of Rashad languages, also called Tegali–Tagoi, varies among descriptions, from two (Williamson & Blench 2000), three (Ethnologue), to eight (Blench ms). Tagoi has a noun-class system like the Atlantic–Congo languages, which is apparently borrowed, but Tegali does not.

Katla languages 

The two Katla languages have no trace of ever having had a Niger–Congo-type noun-class system.

Kadu languages 

Since the work of Thilo C. Schadeberg in 1981, the "Tumtum" or Kadu branch is now widely seen as Nilo-Saharan. However, the evidence is slight, and a conservative classification would treat it as an independent family.

Reconstruction
Quint (2020) suggests that Proto-Kordofanian can be reconstructed from the Heibanian, Talodian, Rashadian, Katloid, and Lafofa languages. His Proto-Kordofanian reconstructions are as follows:

Lexical isoglosses
Starostin (2018) lists the following common lexical isoglosses in the Kordofanian languages. Potential cognates are highlighted in bold.

{| class="wikitable sortable"
! Proto-language
! eye
! bone
! egg
! tooth
! ear
! tongue
! head
! I
! thou
|-
! Proto-Heiban
| *=ey
| *=uya
| *=ɛɲɔ(ŋ)
| *=iŋa-t̪
| *=ɛːni
| *=ŋɛla
| *=da
| *(i)ɲ=i
| *(u)ŋ=a
|-
! Proto-Talodi
| *=igi
| *=umV
| *=uwi(ŋ)
| *=iɲi-t
| *=ɛːnu
| *=lʊŋɛ
| *=âs
| *ŋ=i
| *(u)ŋ=a
|-
! (Proto-)Lafofa
| =î
| =uami
| =uwɛ-
| =ɛːŋı
| 
| liaŋi
| =ay
| ɲɛ-
| ŋɔ-
|-
! Proto-Katla-Tima
| *=igi
| *=uga
| *=iwɔɲ
| 
| *=ɔnɔ
| *=liŋi
| *=as
| ɲɔŋ
| ŋaŋ
|-
! Proto-Rashad
| *=i(ŋ)gə
| *=uh
| *iye (?)
| *=iɲi-n
| *=əni-n
| *=ŋəla
| *=as
| *ŋ=i
| *ŋ=ɔ
|-
! Proto-Kadu
| *=yV
| *kuɓa
| *sule
| *=kini
| *=ɛːsɔ
| *ŋaɗɔ
| *=at̪u
| *aʔa
| *oʔo
|}

Comparative vocabulary
Sample basic vocabulary of the Heiban, Talodi, Rashad, and Lafofa branches:

Note: In table cells with slashes, the singular form is given before the slash, while the plural form follows the slash.

Numerals
Comparison of numerals in individual languages:

See also 
 Languages of the Nuba Mountains

References

Bibliography 
 Herman Bell. 1995. The Nuba Mountains: Who Spoke What in 1976? (archive link).  Being a study of the published results from a major project of the Institute of African and Asian Studies: the Language Survey of the Nuba Mountains.
 Roger Blench.  Unpublished. Does Kordofanian constitute a group and if not, where does its languages fit into Niger-Congo?
 Roger Blench.  Unpublished. Kordofanian and Niger–Congo: new and revised lexical evidence.
 Roger Blench, 2011, Should Kordofanian be split up?, Nuba Hills Conference, Leiden
 P. A. and D. N. MacDiarmid.  1931.  "The languages of the Nuba Mountains."  Sudan Notes and Records 14: 149-162.
 Carl Meinhof. 1915-1919.  "Sprachstudien im egyptischen Sudan".  Zeitschrift für Kolonialsprachen 9-9.  "1. Tagoy." 6: 164-161.  "2. Tumale". 6:182-205.  "11. Tegele." 7:110-131. "12. Rashad." 7:132.
 Thilo C. Schadeberg. 1981a.  A survey of Kordofanian.  SUGIA Beiheft 1-2.  Hamburg:Helmut Buske Verlag.
 Thilo C. Schadeberg. 1981b.  "Das Kordofanische".  Die Sprachen Afrikas.  Band 1: Niger–Kordofanisch, ed. by Bernd Heine, T. C. Schadeberg, Ekkehard Wolff, pp. 117–28  SUGIA Beiheft 1-2.  Hamburg:Helmut Buske Verlag.
 Thilo C. Schadeberg. 1981c.  "The classification of the Kadugli language group".  Nilo-Saharan, ed. by T. C. Schadeberg and M. Lionel Bender, pp. 291–305.  Dordrecht: Foris Publications.
 Brenda Z. Seligmann.  1910-11.  "Note on the language of the Nubas of Southern Kordofan." Zeitschrift für Kolonialsprachen 1:167-188.
 Roland C. Stevenson. 1956-57.  "A survey of the phonetics and grammatical structure of the Nuba Mountains languages, with particular reference to Otoro, Katcha, and Nyimang."  Afrika und Übersee 40:73-84, 93-115; 41:27-65, 117-152, 171-196.
 Tucker, A. N. and M. A. Bryan. 1956.  The Non-Bantu Languages of North-Eastern Africa. (Handbook of African Languages, Part III.)  Oxford University Press: London.
 A. N. Tucker and M. A. Bryan. 1966.  Linguistic Analyses/The Non-Bantu Languages of North-Eastern Africa. (Handbook of African Languages.)  Oxford University Press: London.
 Tutschek, Lorenz.  1848.  "Über die Tumale-Sprache."  Gelehrte Anzeigen, herausgegeben von Mitgliedern der k. bayer.  Akademie der Wissenschaften.  Nrs. 91-93; Spalten 729-52.  (=Bulletin der königl. Akademie der Wissenschaften.  Nrs. 29-31.)
 Tutschek, Lorenz..  1848-50.  "On the Tumali language".  Proceedings of the Philological Society for 1846-47 and 1847-48. Vol 3:239-54.  Proceedings of the Philological Society for 1848-49 and 1849-50. Vol. 4:138-9.

External links

Roger Blench: Kordofanian materials

 

Niger–Congo languages
South Kordofan